Félix Sánchez Olympic Stadium is a multi-purpose stadium in Santo Domingo, Dominican Republic, built in 1974 for the XII Central American & Caribbean Games.

Overview
It is used mostly for football and track and field and as a music venue.

The stadium has a sporting events capacity of 27,000 people, though it has seen crowds of 35,000. For concerts, its stated capacity is 60,000 people. It hosted the Track and Field events and the football tournament at the 2003 Pan American Games.

It was formerly known as Estadio Olímpico Juan Pablo Duarte, because of the sports complex where it is located (Centro Olímpico Juan Pablo Duarte); however, its true and almost unknown official name was Estadio Olímpico Jaime -Capejón- Díaz, in honor of an early 20th-century athlete. The name of the stadium was changed for the 400 m hurdles athlete Félix Sánchez after he won the gold medal at the 2004 Summer Olympics in Athens. He has since won a second gold medal, winning the same event at the 2012 Summer Olympics in London.

Notable events

References

Sources
 events 
 concerts
 installation
stadium data 

Athletics (track and field) venues in the Dominican Republic
Sports venues in Santo Domingo
Multi-purpose stadiums
Venues of the 2003 Pan American Games
Pan American Games opening ceremony stadiums
Pan American Games athletics venues
Sports venues completed in 1974
1974 establishments in the Dominican Republic